(originally written as ; inaccurate Middle French for "The Death of Arthur") is a 15th-century Middle English prose reworking by Sir Thomas Malory of tales about the legendary King Arthur, Guinevere, Lancelot, Merlin and the Knights of the Round Table, along with their respective folklore. In order to tell a "complete" story of Arthur from his conception to his death, Malory compiled, rearranged, interpreted and modified material from various French and English sources. Today, this is one of the best-known works of Arthurian literature. Many authors since the 19th-century revival of the legend have used Malory as their principal source.

Apparently written in prison at the end of the medieval English era, Le Morte d'Arthur was completed by Malory around 1470 and was first published in a printed edition in 1485 by William Caxton. Until the discovery of the Winchester Manuscript in 1934, the 1485 edition was considered the earliest known text of Le Morte d'Arthur and that closest to Malory's original version. Modern editions under myriad titles are inevitably variable, changing spelling, grammar and pronouns for the convenience of readers of modern English, as well as often abridging or revising the material.

History

Authorship

The exact identity of the author of Le Morte d'Arthur has long been the subject of speculation, owing to the fact that at least six historical figures bore the name of "Sir Thomas Malory" (in various spellings) during the late 15th century. In the work, the author describes himself as "Knyght presoner Thomas Malleorre" ("Sir Thomas Maleore" according to the publisher William Caxton). This is taken as supporting evidence for the identification most widely accepted by scholars: that the author was the Thomas Malory born in the year 1416, to Sir John Malory of Newbold Revel, Warwickshire, England.

Sir Thomas inherited the family estate in 1434, but by 1450 he was fully engaged in a life of crime. As early as 1433, he had been accused of theft, but the more serious allegations against him included that of the attempted murder of Humphrey Stafford, 1st Duke of Buckingham, an accusation of at least two rapes, and that he had attacked and robbed Coombe Abbey. Malory was first arrested and imprisoned in 1451 for the ambush of Buckingham, but was released early in 1452. By March, he was back in the Marshalsea prison and then in Colchester, escaping on multiple occasions. In 1461, he was granted a pardon by King Henry VI, returning to live at his estate. Although originally allied to the House of York, after his release Malory changed his allegiance to the House of Lancaster. This led to him being imprisoned yet again in 1468, when he led an ill-fated plot to overthrow King Edward IV. It was during this final stint at Newgate Prison in London that he is believed to have written Le Morte d'Arthur. Malory was released in October 1470, when Henry VI returned to the throne, but died only five months later.

The most likely other candidate who has received support as the possible author of Le Morte Darthur is Thomas Mallory of Papworth St Agnes in Huntingdonshire, whose will, written in Latin and dated 16 September 1469, was described in an article by T. A. Martin in the Athenaeum magazine in September 1897. This Mallory was born in Shropshire in 1425, the son of Sir William Mallory, although there is no indication in the will that he was himself a knight; he died within six weeks of the will being made. It has been suggested that the fact that he appears to have been brought up in Lincolnshire may account for the traces of Lincolnshire dialect in Le Morte Darthur.

Sources

As Elizabeth Bryan wrote of Malory's contribution to Arthurian legend in her introduction to a modern edition of Le Morte d'Arthur, "Malory did not invent the stories in this collection; he translated and compiled them. Malory in fact translated Arthurian stories that already existed in 13th-century French prose (the so-called Old French Vulgate romances) and compiled them together with Middle English sources (the Alliterative Morte Arthure and the Stanzaic Morte Arthur) to create this text."

Within his narration, Malory refers to drawing it from a singular "Freynshe booke", in addition to also unspecified "other bookis". In addition to the vast Vulgate Cycle in its different variants, as well as the English poems Morte Arthur and Morte Arthure, Malory's other original source texts were identified as several French standalone chivalric romances, including Érec et Énide, L'âtre périlleux, Perlesvaus, and Yvain ou le Chevalier au Lion (or its English version, Ywain and Gawain), as well as John Hardyng's English Chronicle. The English poem The Weddynge of Syr Gawen is uncertainly regarded as either just another of these or possibly actually Malory's own work. His assorted other sources might have included a 5th-century Roman military manual, De re militari.

Publication and impact

Le Morte d'Arthur was completed in 1469 or 1470 ("the ninth year of the reign of King Edward IV"), according to a note at the end of the book. It is believed that Malory's original title intended was to be The hoole booke of kyng Arthur & of his noble knyghtes of the rounde table, and only its final section to be named Le Morte Darthur. At the end of the work, Caxton added: "Thus endeth this noble & joyous book entytled le morte Darthur, Notwythstondyng it treateth of the byrth, lyf, and actes of the sayd kynge Arthur; of his noble knyghtes of the rounde table, theyr meruayllous enquestes and aduentures, thachyeuyng of the sangreal, & in thende the dolorous deth & departynge out of this worlde of them al." Caxton separated Malory's eight books into 21 books, subdivided the books into a total of 506 chapters, added a summary of each chapter, and added a colophon to the entire book.

The first printing of Malory's work was made by Caxton in 1485. Only two copies of this original printing are known to exist, in the collections of the Morgan Library & Museum in New York and the John Rylands Library in Manchester. It proved popular and was reprinted in an illustrated form with some additions and changes in 1498 and 1529 by Wynkyn de Worde who succeeded to Caxton's press. Three more editions were published before the English Civil War: William Copland's (1557), Thomas East's (1585), and William Stansby's (1634), each of which contained additional changes and errors (Stansby's being notably poorly translated and highly censored). Thereafter, the book went out of fashion until the Romanticist revival of interest in all things medieval.

The British Library summarizes the importance of Malory's work thus: "It was probably always a popular work: it was first printed by William Caxton (...) and has been read by generations of readers ever since. In a literary sense, Malory’s text is the most important of all the treatments of Arthurian legend in English language, influencing writers as diverse as Edmund Spenser, Alfred, Lord Tennyson, Mark Twain and John Steinbeck."

The Winchester Manuscript

An assistant headmaster at Winchester College, Walter Fraser Oakeshott discovered a previously unknown manuscript copy of the work in June 1934, during the cataloguing of the college's library. Newspaper accounts announced that what Caxton had published in 1485 was not exactly what Malory had written. Oakeshott published "The Finding of the Manuscript" in 1963, chronicling the initial event and his realization that "this indeed was Malory," with "startling evidence of revision" in the Caxton edition. This manuscript is now in the British Library's collection.

Malory scholar Eugène Vinaver examined the manuscript shortly after its discovery. Oakeshott was encouraged to produce an edition himself, but he ceded the project to Vinaver. Based on his initial study of the manuscript, Oakeshott concluded in 1935 that the copy from which Caxton printed his edition "was already subdivided into books and sections." Vinaver made an exhaustive comparison of the manuscript with Caxton's edition and reached similar conclusions. Microscopic examination revealed that ink smudges on the Winchester manuscript are offsets of newly printed pages set in Caxton's own font, which indicates that the Winchester Manuscript was in Caxton's print shop. The manuscript is believed to be closer on the whole to Malory's original and does not have the book and chapter divisions for which Caxton takes credit in his preface. The manuscript has been digitised by a Japanese team, who note that "the text is imperfect, as the manuscript lacks the first and last quires and few leaves. The most striking feature of the manuscript is the extensive use of red ink."

In his 1947 publication of The Works of Sir Thomas Malory, Vinaver argued that Malory wrote not a single book, but rather a series of Arthurian tales, each of which is an internally consistent and independent work. However, William Matthews pointed out that Malory's later tales make frequent references to the earlier events, suggesting that he had wanted the tales to cohere better but had not sufficiently revised the whole text to achieve this. This was followed by much debate in the late 20th-century academia over which version is superior, Caxton's print or Malory's original vision.

Caxton's edition differs from the Winchester manuscript in many places. As well as numerous small differences on every page, there is also a major difference both in style and content in Malory's Book II (Caxton's Book V), describing the war with the Emperor Lucius, where Caxton's version is much shorter. In addition, the Winchester manuscript has none of the customary marks indicating to the compositor where chapter headings and so on were to be added. It has therefore been argued that the Winchester manuscript was not the copy from which Caxton prepared his edition; rather it seems that Caxton either wrote out a different version himself for the use of his compositor, or used another version prepared by Malory.

The Winchester manuscript does not appear to have been copied out by Malory himself; rather, it seems to have been a presentation copy made by two scribes who, judging from certain dialect forms which they introduced into the text, appear to have come from West Northamptonshire. Apart from these forms, both the Winchester manuscript and the Caxton edition show some more northerly dialect forms which, in the judgement of the Middle English dialect expert Angus McIntosh are closest to the dialect of Lincolnshire. McIntosh argues, however, that this does not necessarily rule out the Warwickshire Malory as the possible author; he points out that it could be that the Warwickshire Malory consciously imitated the style and vocabulary of romance literature typical of the period.

Overview

Style
Like other English prose in the 15th century, Le Morte d'Arthur was highly influenced by French writings, but Malory blends these with other English verse and prose forms. The Middle English of Le Morte d'Arthur is much closer to Early Modern English than the Middle English of Geoffrey Chaucer's Canterbury Tales (the publication of Chaucer's work by Caxton was a precursor to Caxton's publication of Malory); if the spelling is modernized, it reads almost like Elizabethan English. Where the Canterbury Tales are in Middle English, Malory extends "one hand to Chaucer, and one to Spenser," by constructing a manuscript which is hard to place in one category. Malory's writing can be divisive today: sometimes seen as simplistic from an artistic viewpoint, "rambling" and full of repetitions, yet there are also opposite opinions, such as of those regarding it a "supreme aesthetic accomplishment". Because there is so much lengthy ground to cover, Malory uses "so—and—then," often to transition his retelling of the stories that become episodes instead of instances that can stand on their own.

Setting and themes

Most of the events take place in a historical fantasy version of Britain and France at an unspecified time (on occasion, the plot ventures farther afield, to Rome and Sarras, and recalls Biblical tales from the ancient Near East). Arthurian myth is set during the 5th to 6th centuries; however, Malory's telling contains many anachronisms and makes no effort at historical accuracy–even more so than his sources. Earlier romance authors have already depicted the "Dark Ages" times of Arthur as a familiar, High-to-Late Medieval style world of armored knights and grand castles taking place of the Post-Roman warriors and forts. Malory further modernized the legend by conflating the Celtic Britain with his own contemporary Kingdom of England (for example explicitly identifying Logres as England, Camelot as Winchester, and Astolat as Guildford) and, completely ahistorically, replacing the legend's Saxon invaders with the Ottoman Turks in the role of King Arthur's foreign pagan enemies. Although Malory hearkens back to an age of idealized vision of knighthood, with chivalric codes of honour and jousting tournaments, his stories lack mentions of agricultural life or commerce. As noted by Ian Scott-Kilvert, characters "consist almost entirely of fighting men, their wives or mistresses, with an occasional clerk or an enchanter, a fairy or a fiend, a giant or a dwarf," and "time does not work on the heroes of Malory."

According to Charles W. Moorman III, Malory intended "to set down in English a unified Arthuriad which should have as its great theme the birth, the flowering, and the decline of an almost perfect earthy civilization." Moorman identified three main motifs going through the work: Sir Lancelot's and Queen Guinevere's affair; the long blood feud between the families of King Lot and King Pellinore; and the mystical Grail Quest. Each of these plots would define one of the causes of the downfall of Arthur's kingdom, namely "the failures in love, in loyalty, in religion."

Volumes and internal chronology

Prior to Caxton's reorganization, Malory's work originally consisted of eight books:
The birth and rise of Arthur: "From the Marriage of King Uther unto King Arthur (that reigned after him and did many battles)" (Fro the Maryage of Kynge Uther unto Kynge Arthure that regned aftir hym and ded many batayles)
Arthur's war against the resurgent Western Romans: "The Noble Tale Between King Arthur and Lucius the Emperor of Rome" (The Noble Tale betwyxt Kynge Arthure and Lucius the Emperour of Rome)
The early adventures of Sir Lancelot: "The Noble Tale of Sir Launcelot of the Lake" (The Noble Tale of Sir Launcelot du Lake)
The story of Sir Gareth: "The Tale of Sir Gareth of Orkney" (The Tale of Sir Gareth of Orkeney)
The legend of Tristan and Iseult: "The Book of Sir Tristram de Lyones" (originally split between The Fyrste Boke of Sir Trystrams de Lyones and The Secunde Boke of Sir Trystrams de Lyones)
The quest for the Grail: "The Noble Tale of the Sangreal" (The Noble Tale of the Sankegreall)
The forbidden love between Lancelot and Guinevere: "Sir Launcelot and Queen Guenever" (Sir Launcelot and Quene Gwenyvere)
The breakup of the Knights of the Round Table and the last battle of Arthur: "The Death of Arthur" (The Deth of Arthur)

Moorman attempted to put the books of the Winchester Manuscript in chronological order. In his analysis, Malory's intended chronology can be divided into three parts: Book I followed by a 20-year interval that includes some events of Book III and others; the 15-year-long period of Book V, also spanning Books IV, II and the later parts of III (in that order); and finally Books VI, VII and VIII in a straightforward sequence beginning with the closing part of Book V (the Joyous Gard section).

Synopsis

Book I (Caxton I–IV)

Arthur is born to the High King of Britain (Malory's "England") Uther Pendragon and his new wife Igraine, and then taken by the wizard Merlin to be secretly fostered by Sir Ector in the country in turmoil after the death of Uther. Years later, the now teenage Arthur suddenly becomes the ruler of the leaderless Britain when he removes the fated sword from the stone in the contest set up by Merlin, which proves his birthright that he himself had not been aware of. The newly crowned King Arthur and his followers including King Ban and King Bors go on to fight against rivals and rebels, ultimately winning the war in the great Battle of Bedegraine. Arthur prevails due to his military prowess and the prophetic and magical counsel of Merlin (later replaced by the sorceress Nimue), further helped by the sword Excalibur that Arthur received from a Lady of the Lake. With the help of reconciled rebels, Arthur also crushes a foreign invasion in the Battle of Clarence. With his throne secure, Arthur marries the also young Princess Guinevere and inherits the Round Table from her father, King Leodegrance. He then gathers his chief knights, including some of his former enemies who now joined him, at his capital Camelot and establishes the Round Table fellowship as all swear to the Pentecostal Oath as a guide for knightly conduct.

The narrative of Malory's first book is mainly based on the Prose Merlin in its version from the Post-Vulgate Suite du Merlin (more specifically, possibly on the manuscript Cambridge University Library, Additional 7071). It also includes the tale of Balyn and Balan (a lengthy section which Malory called a "booke" in itself), as well as other episodes such as the hunt for the Questing Beast and the treason of Arthur's sorceress half-sister Queen Morgan le Fay in the plot involving her lover Accolon. Furthermore, it tells of begetting of Arthur's incestuous son Mordred by one of his other royal half-sisters, Morgause (though Arthur did not know her as his sister); on Merlin's advice, Arthur then takes every newborn boy in his kingdom and all but Mordred, who miraculously survives and eventually indeed kills his father in the end, perish at sea (this is mentioned matter-of-fact, with no apparent moral overtone).

Malory addresses his contemporary preoccupations with legitimacy and societal unrest, which will appear throughout the rest of Le Morte d'Arthur. According to Helen Cooper in Sir Thomas Malory: Le Morte D'arthur – The Winchester Manuscript, the prose style, which mimics historical documents of the time, lends an air of authority to the whole work. This allowed contemporaries to read the book as a history rather than as a work of fiction, therefore making it a model of order for Malory's violent and chaotic times during the Wars of the Roses. Malory's concern with legitimacy reflects 15th-century England, where many were claiming their rights to power through violence and bloodshed.

Book II (Caxton V)
The opening of the second volume finds Arthur and his kingdom without an enemy. His throne is secure, and his knights including Griflet and Tor as well as Arthur's own nephews Gawain and Ywain (sons of Morgause and Morgan, respectively) have proven themselves in various battles and fantastic quests as told in the first volume. Seeking more glory, Arthur and his knights then go to the war against (fictitious) Emperor Lucius who has just demanded Britain to resume paying tribute. Departing from Geoffrey of Monmouth's literary tradition in which Mordred is left in charge (as this happens there near the end of the story), Malory's Arthur leaves his court in the hands of Constantine of Cornwall and sails to Normandy to meet his cousin Hoel. After that, the story details Arthur's march on Rome through Almaine (Germany) and Italy. Following a series of battles resulting in the great victory over Lucius and his allies, and the Roman Senate's surrender, Arthur is crowned a Western Emperor but instead arranges a proxy government and returns to Britain.

This book is based mostly on the first half of the Middle English heroic poem Alliterative Morte Arthure (itself heavily based on Geoffrey's pseudo-chronicle Historia Regum Britanniae). Caxton's print version is abridged by more than half compared to Malory's manuscript. Vinaver theorized that Malory originally wrote this part first as a standalone work, while without knowledge of French romances. In effect, there is a time lapse that includes Arthur's war with King Claudas in France.

Book III (Caxton VI)

Going back to a time before Book II, Malory establishes Sir Lancelot, a young French orphan prince, as King Arthur's most revered knight through numerous episodic adventures, some of which he presented in comedic manner. Lancelot always adheres to the Pentecostal Oath, assisting ladies in distress and giving mercy for honourable enemies he has defeated in combat. However, the world Lancelot lives in is too complicated for simple mandates and, although Lancelot aspires to live by an ethical code, the actions of others make it difficult. Other issues are demonstrated when Morgan le Fay enchants Lancelot, which reflects a feminization of magic, and in how the prominence of jousting tournament fighting in this tale indicates a shift away from battlefield warfare towards a more mediated and virtuous form of violence.

Lancelot's character had previously appeared in the chronologically later Book II, fighting for Arthur against the Romans. In Book III, based on parts of the French Prose Lancelot (mostly its 'Agravain' section, along with the chapel perilous episode taken from Perlesvaus), Malory attempts to turn the focus of courtly love from adultery to service by having Lancelot dedicate doing everything he does for Queen Guinevere, the wife of his lord and friend Arthur, but avoid (for a time being) to committing to an adulterous relationship with her. Nevertheless, it is still her love that is the ultimate source of Lancelot's supreme knightly qualities, something that Malory himself did not appear to be fully comfortable with as it seems to have clashed with his personal ideal of knighthood. Although a catalyst of the fall of Camelot, as it was in the French romantic prose cycle tradition, the moral handling of the adultery between Lancelot and Guinevere in Le Morte implies their relationship is true and pure, as Malory focused on the ennobling aspects of courtly love.

Book IV (Caxton VII) 

The fourth volume primarily deals with the adventures of the young Gareth ("Beaumains") in his long quest for the sibling ladies Lynette and Lioness. The youngest of Arthur's nephews by Morgause and Lot, Gareth hides his identity as a nameless squire at Camelot as to achieve his knighthood in the most honest and honourable way. While this particular story is not directly based on any existing text unlike most of the content of previous volumes, it resembles various Arthurian romances of the Fair Unknown type.

Book V (Caxton VIII–XII)
A collection of the tales about Sir Tristan of Lyonesse as well as a variety of other knights such as Sir Dinadan, Sir Lamorak, Sir Palamedes, Sir Alexander the Orphan (Tristan's young relative abducted by Morgan) and "La Cote de Male Tayle". After telling of Tristan's birth and childhood, its primary focus is on the doomed adulterous relationship between Tristan and the Belle Isolde, wife of his villainous uncle King Mark. It also includes the retrospective story of how Sir Galahad was born to Sir Lancelot and Princess Elaine of Corbenic, followed by Lancelot's years of madness.

Based mainly on the French vast Prose Tristan, or its lost English adaptation (and possibly also the Middle English verse romance Sir Tristrem), Malory's treatment of the legend of the young Cornish prince Tristan is the centerpiece of Le Morte d'Arthur as well as the longest of his eight books. The variety of episodes and the alleged lack of coherence in the Tristan narrative raise questions about its role in Malory's text. However, the book foreshadows the rest of the text as well as including and interacting with characters and tales discussed in other parts of the work. It can be seen as an exploration of secular chivalry and a discussion of honour or "worship" when it is founded in a sense of shame and pride. If Le Morte is viewed as a text in which Malory is attempting to define the concept of knighthood, then the tale of Tristan becomes its critique, rather than Malory attempting to create an ideal knight as he does in some of the other books.

Book VI (Caxton XIII–XVII)

Malory's primary source for this long part was the Vulgate Queste del Saint Graal, chronicling the adventures of many knights in their spiritual quest to achieve the Holy Grail. Gawain is the first to embark on the quest for the Grail. Other knights like Lancelot, Percival, and Bors the Younger, likewise undergo the quest, eventually achieved by Galahad. Their exploits are intermingled with encounters with maidens and hermits who offer advice and interpret dreams along the way.

After the confusion of the secular moral code he manifested within the previous book, Malory attempts to construct a new mode of chivalry by placing an emphasis on religion. Christianity and the Church offer a venue through which the Pentecostal Oath can be upheld, whereas the strict moral code imposed by religion foreshadows almost certain failure on the part of the knights. For instance, Gawain refuses to do penance for his sins, claiming the tribulations that coexist with knighthood as a sort of secular penance. Likewise, the flawed Lancelot, for all his sincerity, is unable to completely escape his adulterous love of Guinevere, and is thus destined to fail where Galahad will succeed. This coincides with the personification of perfection in the form of Galahad, a virgin wielding the power of God. Galahad's life, uniquely entirely without sin, makes him a model of a holy knight that cannot be emulated through secular chivalry.

Book VII (Caxton XVIII–XIX)
The continued story of Lancelot's romance with Guinevere. Lancelot completes a series of trials to prove being worthy of the Queen's love, culminating in his rescue of her from the abduction by the renegade knight Maleagant (this is also the first time the work explicitly mentions the couple's sexual adultery). Writing it, Malory combined the established material from the Vulgate Cycle's Prose Lancelot (including the story of the Fair Maiden of Ascolat and an abridged retelling of Lancelot, the Knight of the Cart) with his own creations (the episodes "The Great Tournament" and "The Healing of Sir Urry").

Book VIII (Caxton XX–XXI) 

Mordred and his half-brother Agravain succeed in revealing Guinevere's adultery and Arthur sentences her to burn. Lancelot's rescue party raids the execution, killing several loyal knights of the Round Table, including Gawain's brothers Gareth and Gaheris. Gawain, bent on revenge, prompts Arthur into a long and bitter war with Lancelot. After they leave to pursue Lancelot in France, where Gawain is mortally injured in a duel with Lancelot (and later finally reconciles with him on his death bed), Mordred seizes the throne and takes control of Arthur's kingdom. At the bloody final battle between Mordred's followers and Arthur's remaining loyalists in England, Arthur kills Mordred but is himself gravely wounded. As Arthur is dying, the lone survivor Bedivere casts Excalibur away, and Morgan and Nimue come to take Arthur to Avalon. Following the passing of King Arthur, who is succeeded by Constantine, Malory provides a denouement about the later deaths of Bedivere, Guinevere, and Lancelot and his kinsmen.

Writing the eponymous final book, Malory used the version of Arthur's death derived primarily from parts of the Vulgate Mort Artu and, as a secondary source, from the English Stanzaic Morte Arthur (or, in another possibility, a hypothetical now-lost French modification of the Mort Artu was a common source of both of these texts). In the words of George Brown, the book "celebrates the greatness of the Arthurian world on the eve of its ruin. As the magnificent fellowship turns violently upon itself, death and destruction also produce repentance, forgiveness, and salvation."

Modern versions and adaptations 

Following the lapse of 182 years since the last printing, the year 1816 saw a new edition by Alexander Chalmers, illustrated by Thomas Uwins (as The History of the Renowned Prince Arthur, King of Britain; with His Life and Death, and All His Glorious Battles. Likewise, the Noble Acts and Heroic Deeds of His Valiant Knights of the Round Table), as well as another one by Joseph Haslewood (as La Mort D'Arthur: The Most Ancient and Famous History of the Renowned Prince Arthur and the Knights of the Round Table), both based on the 1634 Stansby edition. Soon afterward, William Upcott's edition directly based on the rediscovered Morgan copy of the first print version was published in 1817 along with Robert Southey’s introduction and notes including summaries of the original French material from the Vulgate tradition. It then became the basis for subsequent editions until the 1934 discovery of the Winchester Manuscript.

Modernized editions update the late Middle English spelling, update some pronouns, and re-punctuate and re-paragraph the text. Others furthermore update the phrasing and vocabulary to contemporary Modern English. The following sentence (from Caxton's preface, addressed to the reader) is an example written in Middle English and then in Modern English:

Doo after the good and leve the evyl, and it shal brynge you to good fame and renomme. (Do after the good and leave the evil, and it shall bring you to good fame and renown.)

Since the 19th-century Arthurian revival, there have been numerous modern republications, retellings and adaptations of Le Morte d'Arthur. A few of them are listed below (see also the following Bibliography section):

 Malory's book inspired Reginald Heber's unfinished poem Morte D'Arthur. A fragment of it was published by Heber's widow in 1830.
 Victorian poet Alfred Tennyson retold the legends in the poetry volume Idylls of the King (1859 and 1885). His work focuses on Le Morte d'Arthur and the Mabinogion, with many expansions, additions and several adaptations, such as the fate of Guinevere (in Malory, she is sentenced to be burnt at the stake but is rescued by Lancelot; in the Idylls, Guinevere flees to a convent, is forgiven by Arthur, repents and serves in the convent until her death).
 James Thomas Knowles published Le Morte d'Arthur as The Legends of King Arthur and His Knights in 1860. Originally illustrated by George Housman Thomas, it has been subsequently illustrated by various other artists, including William Henry Margetson and Louis Rhead. The 1912 edition was illustrated by Lancelot Speed, who later also illustrated Rupert S. Holland's 1919 King Arthur and the Knights of the Round Table that was based on Knowles with addition of some material from the 12th-century Perceval, the Story of the Grail.
 In 1880, Sidney Lanier published a much expurgated rendition entitled The Boy's King Arthur: Sir Thomas Malory's History of King Arthur and His Knights of the Round Table, Edited for Boys, an enduringly popular children's adaptation, originally illustrated by Alfred Kappes. A new edition with illustrations by N. C. Wyeth was first published in 1917. This version was later incorporated into Grosset and Dunlap's series of books called the Illustrated Junior Library, and reprinted under the title King Arthur and his Knights of the Round Table (1950).
 In 1892, London publisher J. M. Dent produced an illustrated edition of Le Morte Darthur in modern spelling, with illustrations by 20-year-old insurance office clerk and art student Aubrey Beardsley. It was issued in 12 parts between June 1893 and mid-1894, and met with only modest success, but was later described as Beardsley's first masterpiece, launching what has come to be known as the "Beardsley look". It was Beardsley's first major commission, and included nearly 585 chapter openings, borders, initials, ornaments and full- or double-page illustrations. The majority of the Dent edition illustrations were reprinted by Dover Publications in 1972 under the title Beardsley's Illustrations for Le Morte Darthur. A facsimile of the Beardsley edition, complete with Malory's unabridged text, was published in the 1990s.
 Mary MacLeod's popular children's adaptation King Arthur and His Noble Knights: Stories From Sir Thomas Malory's Morte D'Arthur was first published with illustrations by Arthur George Walker in 1900 and subsequently reprinted in various editions and in extracts in children's magazines.
 Beatrice Clay wrote a retelling first included in her Stories from Le Morte Darthur and the Mabinogion (1901). A retitled version, Stories of King Arthur and the Round Table (1905), features illustrations by Dora Curtis.
 In 1902, Andrew Lang published The Book of Romance, a retelling of Malory illustrated by Henry Justice Ford. It was retitled as Tales of King Arthur and the Round Table in the 1909 edition.
 Howard Pyle wrote and illustrated a series of four books: The Story of King Arthur and His Knights (1903), The Story of the Champions of the Round Table (1905), The Story of Sir Launcelot and His Companions (1907), and The Story of the Grail and the Passing of King Arthur (1910). Rather than retell the stories as written, Pyle presented his own versions of select episodes enhanced with other tales and his own imagination.
 Another children adaptation, Henry Gilbert's King Arthur's Knights: The Tales Retold for Boys and Girls, was first published in 1911, originally illustrated by Walter Crane. Highly popular, it was reprinted many times until 1940, featuring also illustrations from other artists such as Frances Brundage and Thomas Heath Robinson.
 Alfred W. Pollard published an abridged edition of Malory in 1917, illustrated by Arthur Rackham. Pollard later also published a complete version in four volumes during 1910-1911 and in two volumes in 1920, with illustrations by William Russell Flint.
 T. H. White's The Once and Future King (1938–1977) is a famous and influential retelling of Malory's work. White rewrote the story in his own fashion. His rendition contains intentional and obvious anachronisms and social-political commentary on contemporary matters. White made Malory himself a character and bestowed upon him the highest praise.
 Pollard's 1910-1911 abridged edition of Malory provided basis for John W. Donaldson's 1943 book Arthur Pendragon of Britain. It was illustrated by N. C. Wyeth son, Andrew Wyeth.
 Roger Lancelyn Green and Richard Lancelyn Green published King Arthur and His Knights of the Round Table in 1953.
 Alex Blum's comic book retelling Knights of the Round Table was published in the Classics Illustrated series in 1953.
 John Steinbeck utilized the Winchester Manuscripts of Thomas Malory and other sources as the original text for his The Acts of King Arthur and His Noble Knights. This retelling was intended for young people but was never completed. It was published posthumously in 1976 as The Book of King Arthur and His Noble Knights of the Round Table.
 Walker Percy credited his childhood reading of The Boy's King Arthur for his own novel Lancelot (1977).
 Thomas Berger described his 1978 novel Arthur Rex as his memory of the "childish version" by Elizabeth Lodor Merchant that began his fascination in the Arthurian legend in 1931.
 Excalibur, a 1981 British film directed, produced, and co-written by John Boorman, retells Le Morte d'Arthur, with some changes to the plot and fate of certain characters (such as merging Morgause with Morgan, who dies in this version).
 Marion Zimmer Bradley's 1983 The Mists of Avalon retold Le Morte d'Arthur from a feminist neopagan perspective.
 In 1984, the ending of Malory's story was turned by John Barton and Gillian Lynne into a BBC2 non-speaking (that is featuring only Malory's narration and silent actors) television drama, titled simply Le Morte d'Arthur.
 Emma Gelders Sterne, Barbara Lindsay, Gustaf Tenggren and Mary Pope Osborne published King Arthur and the Knights of the Round Table in 2002.
 Jeff Limke's and Tom Yeates' comic book adaptation of a part of Malory's Book I was published as King Arthur: Excalibur Unsheathed in 2006, followed by Arthur & Lancelot: The Fight for Camelot in 2007.
 Castle Freeman Jr.'s 2008 novel Go with Me is a modern retelling of Malory's Tale of Sir Gareth.
 In 2009, Dorsey Armstrong published a Modern English translation that focused on the Winchester manuscript rather than the Caxton edition.
 Peter Ackroyd's 2010 novel The Death of King Arthur is a modern English retelling of Le Morte d'Arthur.

Bibliography

The work itself
 Editions based on the Winchester manuscript:
Facsimile:
 Malory, Sir Thomas. The Winchester Malory: A Facsimile. Introduced by Ker, N. R. (1976). London: Early English Text Society. .
 Original spelling:
 Malory, Sir Thomas. Le Morte Darthur. (A Norton Critical Edition). Ed. Shepherd, Stephen H. A. (2004). New York: W. W. Norton. 
 _. The Works of Sir Thomas Malory. Ed. Vinaver, Eugène. 3rd ed. Field, Rev. P. J. C. (1990). 3 vol. Oxford: Oxford University Press. .
 _. Malory: Complete Works. Ed. Vinaver, Eugène (1977). Oxford: Oxford University Press. . (Revision and retitling of Malory: Works of 1971).
 _. Malory: Works. Ed. Vinaver, Eugène (1971). 2nd ed. Oxford: Oxford University Press. .
 _. The Works of Sir Thomas Malory. Ed. Vinaver, Eugène (1967). 2nd ed. 3 vol. Oxford: Clarendon Press. .
 _. Malory: Works. Ed. Vinaver, Eugène (1954). Oxford: Oxford University Press. . (Malory's text from Vinaver's The Works of Sir Thomas Malory (1947), in a single volume dropping most of Vinaver's notes and commentary.)
 _. The Works of Sir Thomas Malory. Ed. Vinaver, Eugène (1947). 3 vol. Oxford: Clarendon Press.
 Modernised spelling:
 Malory, Sir Thomas. Le Morte Darthur: The Winchester Manuscript. Ed. Cooper, Helen (1998). Oxford: Oxford University Press.  (Abridged text.)
 Translation/paraphrase into contemporary English:
 Armstrong, Dorsey. Sir Thomas Malory's Morte Darthur: A New Modern English Translation Based on the Winchester Manuscript (Renaissance and Medieval Studies) Anderson, SC: Parlor Press, 2009. .
 Malory, Sir Thomas. Malory's Le Morte D'Arthur: King Arthur and Legends of the Round Table. Trans. and abridged by Baines, Keith (1983). New York: Bramhall House. . Reissued by Signet (2001). .
 _. Le Morte D'Arthur. (London Medieval & Renaissance Ser.) Trans. Lumiansky, Robert M. (1982). New York: Charles Scribner's Sons. .
 John Steinbeck, and Thomas Malory. The Acts of King Arthur and His Noble Knights: From the Winchester Manuscripts of Thomas Malory and Other Sources. (1976) New York: Noonday Press. Reissued 1993. . (Unfinished)
 Brewer, D.S. Malory: The Morte Darthur. York Medieval Texts, Elizabeth Salter and Derek Pearsall, Gen. Eds. (1968) London: Edward Arnold. Reissued 1993. . (Modernized spelling version of Books 7 and 8 as a complete story in its own right. Based on Winchester MS, but with changes taken from Caxton, and some emendations by Brewer.)
 Editions based on Caxton's edition:
Facsimile:
 Malory, Sir Thomas. Le Morte d'Arthur, printed by William Caxton, 1485. Ed. Needham, Paul (1976). London.
 Original spelling:
 Malory, Sir Thomas. Caxton's Malory. Ed. Spisak, James. W. (1983). 2 vol. boxed. Berkeley and Los Angeles: University of California Press. .
 _. Le Morte Darthur by Sir Thomas Malory. Ed. Sommer, H. Oskar (1889–91). 3 vol. London: David Nutt. The text of Malory from this edition without Sommer's annotation and commentary and selected texts of Malory's sources is available on the web at:
 _. Tales of King Arthur and the Knights of the Round Table. Caxton's text, with illustrations by Aubrey Beardsley and a foreword by Sarah Peverley (2017). Flame Tree Publishing. .
 –––.  Le Morte Darthur, Corpus of Middle English Prose and Verse: University of Michigan.
 Modernised spelling:
 Malory, Sir Thomas. Le Morte d'Arthur. Ed. Matthews, John (2000). Illustrated by Ferguson, Anna-Marie. London: Cassell. . (The introduction by John Matthews praises the Winchester text but then states this edition is based on the Pollard version of the Caxton text, with eight additions from the Winchester manuscript.)
 _. Le Morte Darthur. Introduction by Moore, Helen (1996). Herefordshire: Wordsworth Editions Ltd. . (Seemingly based on the Pollard text.)
 _. Le morte d'Arthur. Introduction by Bryan, Elizabeth J. (1994). New York: Modern Library. . (Pollard text.)
 _. Le Morte d'Arthur. Ed. Cowen, Janet (1970). Introduction by Lawlor, John. 2 vols. London: Penguin. .
 _. Le Morte d'Arthur. Ed. Rhys, John (1906). (Everyman's Library 45 & 46.) London: Dent; London: J. M. Dent; New York: E. P. Dutton. Released in paperback format in 1976: . (Text based on an earlier modernised Dent edition of 1897.)
 _. Le Morte Darthur: Sir Thomas Malory's Book of King Arthur and of his Noble Knights of the Round Table,. Ed. Pollard, A. W. (1903). 2 vol. New York: Macmillan. (Text corrected from the bowdlerised 1868 Macmillan edition edited by Sir Edward Strachey.) Available on the web at:
 _. Le Morte Darthur. Ed. Simmon, F. J. (1893–94). Illustrated by Beardsley, Aubrey. 2 vol. London: Dent.
 Project Gutenberg: Le Morte Darthur: Volume 1 (books 1–9) and Le Morte Darthur: Volume 2 (books 10–21). (Plain text.)
 Electronic Text Center, University of Virginia Library: Le Morte Darthur: Volume 1 (books 1–9) and Le Morte Darthur: Volume 2 (books 10–21) (HTML.)
 Celtic Twilight: Legends of Camelot: Le Morte d'Arthur (HTML with illustrations by Aubrey Beardsley from the Dent edition of 1893–94.)

Commentary
 Glossary to Le Morte d'Arthur at Glossary to Book 1 and Glossary to Book 2 (PDF)
 Malory's Morte d'Arthur and Style of the Morte d'Arthur, selections by Alice D. Greenwood with bibliography from the Cambridge History of English Literature.
 Arthur Dies at the End by Jeff Wikstrom
 About the Winchester manuscript:
 University of Georgia: English Dept: Jonathan Evans: Walter F. Oakeshott and the Winchester Manuscript. (Contains links to the first public announcements concerning the Winchester manuscript from The Daily Telegraph, The Times, and The Times Literary Supplement.)
 UBC Dept. of English: Siân Echard: Caxton and Winchester (link offline on Oct. 25, 2011; according to message on Ms. Echard's Medieval Pages, "September 2011: Most of the pages below are being renovated, so the links are (temporarily) inactive.")
 Department of English, Goucher College: Arnie Sanders: The Malory Manuscript

Other
 Bryan, Elizabeth J. (1999/1994). "Sir Thomas Malory", Le Morte D'Arthur, p. v. New York: Modern Library. .
 Lumiansky, R. M. (1987). "Sir Thomas Malory's Le Morte Darthur, 1947-1987: Author, Title, Text". Speculum Vol. 62, No. 4 (Oct., 1987), pp. 878–897. The University of Chicago Press on behalf of the Medieval Academy of America
 Whitteridge, Gweneth. "The Identity of Sir Thomas Malory, Knight-Prisoner." The Review of English Studies; 24.95 (1973): 257–265. JSTOR. Web. 30 November 2009.

See also

Illegitimacy in fiction – In Le Morte d'Arthur, King Arthur is conceived illegitimately when his father Uther Pendragon utilizes Merlin's magic to seduce Igraine
James Archer – one of 19th-century British artists inspired by Malory's book

References

External links

 
 Full Text of Volume One – at Project Gutenberg
 Full Text of Volume Two – at Project Gutenberg
 
 Different copies of La Mort d'Arthur at the Internet Archive

1485 books
Adaptations of works by Chrétien de Troyes
Arthurian literature in Middle English
Books published posthumously
British books
Medieval literature
Prison writings
Romance (genre)
Works by Thomas Malory